Charles Wayne Foster (July 2, 1953 – March 31, 2019) was an American hurdler. He finished in fourth place, just off the podium at the 1976 Summer Olympics in Montreal while setting his lifetime personal best of 13.41.  In 1974 he was the number one ranked hurdler in the world, number 2 in 1975 and in the top ten from 1973 until 1979.

Career
Born in Greensboro, North Carolina, Foster ran for North Carolina Central University, winning the 1974 NCAA Championships.  A few weeks later that season, he won the National Championships.  On tour, he also won the French national championship.  The NCAA victory qualified him for the World University Games the following year, where he won the Gold Medal.   He was able to win the National Championship again in 1977 in a tie with UCLA's James Owens, making him the U.S. representative at the 1977 IAAF World Cup, where he won a bronze medal.  He picked up an additional bronze medal in international competition at the 1979 Pan American Games.  He also picked up a pair of National Indoor championships in 1975 and 1978.

Foster's career began at Gaffney High School in Gaffney, South Carolina, where he was state champion and the 1971 Junior National Champion in the 120 yard high hurdles.

After his athletic career, he went into coaching at the University of North Carolina, Clemson University and Virginia Tech.  He was involved with the organizing committee for the 1996 Summer Olympics in Atlanta and with the 1999 Special Olympics.

References

External links
 
 Foster instructing at the USTFCCCA Convention

1953 births
2019 deaths
American male hurdlers
Athletes (track and field) at the 1976 Summer Olympics
Athletes (track and field) at the 1979 Pan American Games
Olympic track and field athletes of the United States
Sportspeople from Greensboro, North Carolina
Pan American Games bronze medalists for the United States
Pan American Games medalists in athletics (track and field)
Universiade medalists in athletics (track and field)
Universiade gold medalists for the United States
Medalists at the 1975 Summer Universiade
Medalists at the 1979 Pan American Games